Elections to Wiltshire Council, a new unitary authority, were held on 4 June 2009.

The whole council of ninety-eight members was up for election, with each member to be elected in a single-member electoral division. None of the new electoral divisions was identical to any of the divisions or wards of the council's predecessors, Wiltshire County Council and the four district councils within its area, Kennet, North Wiltshire, Salisbury and West Wiltshire.

As with other county elections in England, these local elections in Wiltshire took place on the same day as the European elections of 2009. The 2005 Wiltshire County Council election, the last to the old county council, coincided with the general election of 2005, and the county elections of 1997 and 2001 had also coincided with general elections.

Reorganization
Wiltshire's "two tier" system of local government until 2009 was typical of English shire counties, with the county, excluding the pre-existing unitary authority of Swindon, being sub-divided into four local government districts. However, the Department for Communities and Local Government announced on 25 July 2007 that with effect from 1 April 2009 Wiltshire was to be served by a new unitary authority, replacing Wiltshire County Council and the four district councils within its area, with Swindon continuing as a separate unitary authority.

Although the new authority came into being on 1 April 2009, the date on which the four district councils ceased to exist, the first elections to the new council were not held until 4 June. For some two months, the role of elected members of the new authority was carried out by the 48 outgoing Wiltshire county councillors and by an "Implementation Executive" consisting of eight members appointed from the outgoing county council and two members from each of the outgoing districts.

Results

|}

Electoral division results

Aldbourne and Ramsbury

Alderbury and Whiteparish

Amesbury East

Amesbury West

Bourne and Woodford Valley

Box and Colerne

Bradford on Avon North

Bradford on Avon South

Brinkworth

Bromham, Rowde and Potterne

Bulford, Allington and Figheldean

Burbage and the Bedwyns

By Brook

Calne Central

Calne Chilvester and Abberd

Calne North

Calne Rural

Calne South and Cherhill

Chippenham Cepen Park and Derriads

Chippenham Cepen Park and Redlands

Chippenham Hardenhuish

Chippenham Hardens and England

Chippenham Lowden and Rowden

Chippenham Monkton

Chippenham Pewsham

Chippenham Queens and Sheldon

Corsham Pickwick

Corsham Town

Corsham Without and Box Hill

Cricklade and Latton

Devizes and Roundway South

Devizes East

Devizes North

Downton and Ebble Valley

Durrington and Larkhill

Ethandune

Fovant and Chalke Valley

Hilperton

Holt and Staverton

Kington

Laverstock, Ford and Old Sarum

Ludgershall and Perham Down

Lyneham

Malmesbury

Marlborough East

Marlborough West

Melksham Central

Melksham North

Melksham South

Melksham Without North

Melksham Without South

Mere

Minety

Nadder and East Knoyle

Pewsey

Pewsey Vale

Purton

Redlynch and Landford

Roundway

Salisbury Bemerton

Salisbury Fisherton & Bemerton Village

Salisbury Harnham

Salisbury St Edmund & Milford

Salisbury St Francis and Stratford

Salisbury St Marks and Bishopdown

Salisbury St Martins and Cathedral

Salisbury St Pauls

Sherston

Southwick

Summerham and Seend

The Collingbournes and Netheravon

The Lavingtons and Erlestoke

Tidworth

Till and Wylye Valley

Tisbury

Trowbridge Adcroft

Trowbridge Central

Trowbridge Drynham

Trowbridge Grove

Trowbridge Lambrok

Trowbridge Park

Trowbridge Paxcroft

Urchfont and The Cannings

Warminster Broadway

Warminster Copheap and Wylye

Warminster East

Warminster West

Warminster Without

West Selkley

Westbury East

Westbury North

Westbury West

Wilton and Lower Wylye Valley

Winsley and Westwood

Winterslow

Wootton Bassett East

Wootton Bassett North

Wootton Bassett South

By-elections between 2009 and 2013

Southwick

Bromham, Rowde and Potterne

See also
Wiltshire local elections

References

External links
Election results at Wiltshire Council website
Local Elections 2009 Wiltshire at andrewteale.me.uk

2009
2009 English local elections
2000s in Wiltshire